Ralph De Voil was a priest who worked as a missionary for the Anglican Church in Melanesia.

De Voil was born at Clifton, Bristol on 10 January 1903; and educated at the University of Leeds and the College of the Resurrection. He was ordained deacon in 1928 and priest in 1929. After a curacy in Oxhey he went out to Melanesia in 1931 and was Archdeacon of Northern Melanesia from 1934 to 1937. He served the Scottish Episcopal Church from 1937 to 1941, firstly in Aberdeen, then in Clydebank. He was Vicar of Mickley, North Yorkshire from 1941 to 1945; of Winterton from 1945 to 1948; and Castleton, North Yorkshire from 1948 to 1950. He then went out to Australia where he served in Chinchilla,  Brisbane and Beaudesert.

De Voil died at Brisbane on 1 Mar 1977.

References

Anglican missionaries in the Solomon Islands
20th-century Anglican priests
Alumni of the University of Leeds
Alumni of the College of the Resurrection
People from Clifton, Bristol
1903 births
1977 deaths
Archdeacons of Northern Melanesia
Anglican missionaries in Vanuatu
English Anglican missionaries